Millettia mossambicensis is a species of plant in the family Fabaceae. It is endemic to central Mozambique, where it is fairly widespread in the low-lying woodlands and forests. The small trees are over-exploited for local construction purposes.

The leaves have two or three pairs of leaflets and one terminal leaflet which is largest. Leaflets have 9 to 11 pairs of lateral, parallel veins. The purple-blue flowers are carried on racemes which appear in spring.

See also
 Southern Zanzibar-Inhambane coastal forest mosaic

References

mossambicensis
Flora of Mozambique
Data deficient plants
Endemic flora of Mozambique
Taxonomy articles created by Polbot